Aymen Dahmen (born 28 January 1997) is a Tunisian professional footballer who plays as a goalkeeper for the Tunisian club CS Sfaxien.

Club career
Dahmen made his professional debut with CS Sfaxien in a 2–0 Tunisian Ligue Professionnelle 1 win over ES Métlaoui on 16 September 2018.

International career
Dahmen was called up to represent the Tunisia U23 national team for 2019 Africa U-23 Cup of Nations qualification matches.

He made his debut for senior national team on 28 March 2021 in an AFCON 2021 qualifier against Equatorial Guinea.

On November 14, 2022, he was selected by Jalel Kadri to participate in the 2022 FIFA World Cup. He participated in all Tunisia's matches in the World Cup.

Honours 
CS Sfaxien

 Tunisian Cup: 2018–19, 2020–21, 2021–22

References

External links

1997 births
Living people
People from Sfax
Tunisian footballers
Tunisia youth international footballers
Tunisia international footballers
Association football goalkeepers
CS Sfaxien players
Tunisian Ligue Professionnelle 1 players
2022 FIFA World Cup players